Primer Acto is a Spanish bi-monthly theater magazine based in Madrid, Spain. It has been in circulation since April 1957.

History and profile
Primer Acto was established in 1957, and the first issue appeared in April of that year. It was started as a successor to Teatro, which existed from 1952 to 1957. The magazine is published on a bi-monthly basis and covers Latin American and Spanish theatre. José Monleón is the director of the magazine, which is headquartered in Madrid. One of the earlier directors was José Monleon. José Luis Alonso is among the former editors. At the beginning of the 1960s the members of the editorial board included Arnold Wesker and Kenneth Tynan.

References

External links

Archived issues of the magazine from 1971

1957 establishments in Spain
Bi-monthly magazines published in Spain
Magazines established in 1957
Magazines published in Madrid
Spanish-language magazines
Theatre in Spain
Theatre magazines